is an original Japanese manga story arc of The Incredible Hulk. It was originally published in Japan in 1970 and 1971. It was alternately authored by Yukio Togawa and Kazuo Koike, with art by Kosei Saigo and Yoshihiro Morito with ripped art from Herb Trimpe.

Spider-Man also got this treatment, with the Spider-Man stories (primarily by Ryoichi Ikegami) proving quite popular, leading to many reprints over the years. Other attempts were made at crossover properties in the 1990s with X-Men: The Manga being created to follow the storyline of the anime. The Hulk stories were less fortunate, and have never been reprinted or translated since their initial outings. Consequently, very little is known about the series.

Distinctively, these stories were just referred to as Hulk, rather than The Incredible Hulk as with Japanese Language International Editions of Marvel U.S. stories.

See also
 Spider-Man: The Manga
 X-Men: The Manga

References

External links
Lone Wolf and Cub Interlude: Haruku: The Manga, includes art samples

1970 comics debuts
1971 comics endings
Manga
Kazuo Koike
Superheroes in anime and manga
Manga based on comics